Igea is a village in the province and autonomous community of La Rioja, Spain.

Politics

Notable people 
 Toribio Minguella, bishop and senator

 Juan José de Ovejas y Díaz, Marquis de Casa Torre

 Pedro María Sanz Alonso, President of the autonomous community of La Rioja from 1995 to 2015

 Ángel Saéz-Benito

References

Populated places in La Rioja (Spain)